This is a list of town and locality names in South Australia outside the metropolitan postal area of Adelaide.

For a list of suburbs in metropolitan areas of Adelaide, see lists inside following individual city council articles:  City of Adelaide, City of Burnside, City of Campbelltown, City of Charles Sturt, Town of Gawler, City of Holdfast Bay, City of Marion, City of Mitcham, City of Norwood Payneham St Peters, City of Onkaparinga, City of Playford, City of Port Adelaide Enfield, City of Prospect, City of Salisbury, City of Tea Tree Gully, City of Unley, City of West Torrens and Town of Walkerville
See also List of South Australian place names changed from German names



A
Adelaide
Agery
Alawoona
Alford
Allendale East
American River
Andamooka
Andrews
Angaston
Angle Vale
Appila
Ardrossan
Armagh
Arno Bay
Arthurton
Auburn
Avenue Range

B
Bagot Well
Baird Bay
Balaklava
Balgowan
Balhannah
Barmera
Barabba
Beachport
Beltana
Berri
Bethany
Binnum
Birdwood
Black Hill
Black Point
Blakiston
Blanche Harbor
Blanchetown
Blinman
Blyth
Booborowie
Booleroo Centre
Bordertown
Borrika
Border Village
Boston
Bower
Bowhill
Bowmans
Bridgewater
Brentwood
Brinkworth
Bruce 
Brukunga
Buckleboo
Burra
Burrungule
Bute
Butler

C
Cadell
Calca
Callington
Calomba
Caloote
Calperum Station
Cultana
Caltowie
Cambrai
Cape Jervis
Carpenter Rocks
Carrickalinga
Carrieton
Ceduna
Charleston
Cherry Gardens
Cherryville
Chowilla
Clare
Clarendon
Clayton Bay
Cleve
Clinton
Cobdogla
Cockaleechie
Cockatoo Valley
Cockburn
Coffin Bay
Commissariat Point
Coober Pedy
Coobowie
Cook
Cooke Plains
Cooltong
Coomandook
Coonalpyn
Coonawarra
Coorabie
Copeville
Copley
Corny Point
Coulta
Cowell
Cradock
Crystal Brook
Cudlee Creek
Culburra
Cummins
Cungena
Curramulka
Currency Creek

D
Danggali
Darke Peak
Davenport
Dawesley
Delamere
Donovans
Dowlingville
Dublin
Dutton

E
Eden Valley
Ediacara
Edillilie
Edithburgh
Elliston
Encounter Bay
Ernabella
Eudunda

F
Farrell Flat
False Bay
Felixstow
Finniss
Forreston
Foul Bay
Fowlers Bay
Frances
Freeling
Fregon
Furner
Farina

G
Galga
Gawler
Georgetown
Geranium
Giles Corner
Gladstone
Glencoe
Glendambo
Gluepot
Goolwa
Grange
Greenock
Greenways
Gulnare
Gumeracha

H
Hahndorf
Halbury
Halidon
Hallett
Hallett Cove
Hallett Cove
Hamilton
Hamley Bridge
Hammond
Harrogate
Hartley
Haslam
Hatherleigh
Hawker
Hayborough
Head of the Bight
Henley Beach
Hill River
Hilltown
Hincks
Honiton
Hoyleton
Hynam

I
Innamincka
Inman Valley
Inneston
Iron Baron
Iron Knob
Island Beach

J
Jabuk
Jamestown
James Well
Jervois

K
Kadina
Kainton
Kalangadoo
Kanmantoo
Kapunda
Karkoo
Karoonda
Keith
Kersbrook
Keyneton
Ki Ki
Kielpa
Kimba
Kingoonya
Kingscote
Kingston SE
Kingston-On-Murray
Kongorong
Koolunga
Koppio
Korunye
Krondorf
Kunytjanu
Kyancutta
Kybybolite

L
Lightsview
Lake View
Lameroo
Langhorne Creek
Laura
Leigh Creek
Lenswood
Lewiston
Linwood
Light Pass
Lipson
Littlehampton
Lobethal
Lochiel
Lock
Long Plains
Longwood
Louth Bay
Loveday
Lower Light
Loxton
Loxton North
Lucindale
Lyndhurst
Lyndoch
Lyrup

M
Macclesfield
Maitland
Mallala
Mambray Creek
Manna Hill
Mannum
Manoora
Mantung
Marama
Marananga
Marion Bay
Marla
Marrabel
Marree
McCracken
Meadows
Melrose
Meningie
Mercunda
Merriton
Middleback Range
Middle Beach
Middleton
Mil Lel
Milang
Millicent
Mindarie
Minlaton
Minnipa
Mintabie
Mintaro
Miranda
Moana
Moculta
Monarto South
Monash
Moonta
Moorak
Moorlands
Moorook
Morchard
Morgan
Mount Barker
Mount Bryan
Mount Burr
Mount Compass
Mount Gambier
Mount Pleasant
Mount Torrens
Mullaquana
Mundallio
Mundoora
Murdinga
Murray Bridge
Murray Bridge East
Murray Bridge South
Murray Town
Mylor
Mypolonga
Myponga

N
Nackara
Nain
Nairne
Nangwarry
Nantawarra
Naracoorte
Narrung
New Well
Nildottie
Ninnes
Noarlunga
Nonning
Normanville
Northgate
Norton Summit
Nullarbor
Nundroo
Nuriootpa

O
OB Flat
Oakbank
Olary
Olympic Dam
Oodnadatta
Orroroo
Owen
Overland Corner

P
Padthaway
Palmer
Parachilna
Paratoo
Parham
Parilla
Paringa
Parndana
Parrakie
Paruna
Paskeville
Peake
Peebinga
Penneshaw
Penola
Penrice
Penwortham
Perlubie
Perponda
Peterborough
Piccadilly
Pine Point
Pinkerton Plains
Pinnaroo
Point Boston
Point Lowly
Point Mcleay
Point Pass
Point Pearce
Point Souttar
Point Sturt
Point Turton
Polda
Poochera
Port Arthur
Port Augusta
Port Augusta North
Port Augusta West
Port Broughton
Port Elliot
Port Flinders
Port Gawler
Port Germein
Port Hughes
Port Julia
Port Kenny
Port Lincoln
Port MacDonnell
Port Neill
Port Paterson 
Port Pirie
Port Pirie South
Port Pirie West
Port Victoria
Port Vincent
Port Wakefield
Port Willunga
Price
Proof Range
Punyelroo

Q
Quorn
Qualco

R
Ramco
Rapid Bay
Raukkan
Redbanks
Redhill
Reeves Plains
Rendelsham
Renmark
Renmark South
Riverton
Risdon Park
Risdon Park South
Riverton
Robe
Robertstown
Rogues Point
Roseworthy
Rowland Flat
Roxby Downs
Rudall

S
Saddleworth
Saltia 
Sandalwood
Sanderston
Sandilands
Sandy Creek
Sapphiretown
Sceale Bay
Seacliff
Seacombe Heights
Seaford
Second Valley
Secret Rocks
Sedan
Semaphore
Semaphore South
Seppeltsfield
Shea-Oak Log
Sherlock
Smoky Bay
Snowtown
Solomontown
South Kilkerran
Southend
Spalding
Springton
Stanley Flat
Stansbury
Stenhouse Bay
Stirling
Stirling North
Stockport
Stockwell
Stone Hut
Stone Well
Strathalbyn
Streaky Bay
Sultana Point
Summertown
Sutherlands
Swan Reach

T
Tailem Bend
Taldra
Tantanoola
Tanunda
Taplan
Tarcoola
Tarcowie
Tarlee
Tarpeena
Taylorville Station
Templers
Terowie
Thevenard
Thompson Beach
Tickera
Tiddy Widdy Beach
Tintinara
Tirulla
Tooligie
Totness
Trihi
Truro
Tumby Bay
Tungkillo
Two Wells

U
Uleybury
Ungarra
Upper Sturt
Uraidla

V
Veitch
Venus Bay
Verdun
Victor Harbor
Virginia

W
Waikerie
Wallaroo
Wami Kata
Wanbi
Wangary
Wanilla
Warnertown
Warooka
Warrachie
Warramboo
Warrow
Wasleys
Watervale
Waukaringa
Webb Beach
Weetulta
Wellington
Wharminda
Whites Flat
Whyalla
Whyalla Barson
Whyalla Jenkins
Whyalla Norrie
Whyalla Playford
Whyalla Stuart
Whyte Yarcowie
Williamstown
Willunga
Wilmington
Windsor
Winkie
Winninowie
Wirrabara
Wirrulla
Wistow
Witchelina
Wolseley
Woodside
Wool Bay
Woolundunga
Woomera
Wudinna
Wynarka

Y
Yacka
Yahl
Yalata
Yallunda Flat
Yaninee
Yankalilla
Yeelanna
Yellabinna
Yongala
Yorketown
Younghusband
Yumali
Yunta

South Australia, cities and towns
South Australia-related lists
Lists of towns in Australia
Lists of cities in Australia